Rich Nigga Shit may refer to:

 "Rich Nigga Shit", a song by 21 Savage and Metro Boomin featuring Young Thug from Savage Mode II (2020)
 "Rich Nigga Shit", a song by Young Thug and Juice Wrld from Punk (2021)